Lloyd's Diner is a historic diner at 184A Fountain Street in Framingham, Massachusetts.  Formerly Whit's Diner in Orange, Massachusetts, it was moved its present location in 1990.  Built as #783 by the Worcester Lunch Car Company in 1942, it was operated by Robert and Richard Whitney until about 1960 as Whit's, and then under other ownership as the Orange Diner.  It was purchased by Richard and Joan Lloyd in 1990 and moved to Framingham.

The diner was listed on the National Register of Historic Places in 2003.

See also
National Register of Historic Places listings in Framingham, Massachusetts

References

Diners on the National Register of Historic Places
Diners in Massachusetts
Restaurants on the National Register of Historic Places in Massachusetts
Buildings and structures in Framingham, Massachusetts
Commercial buildings completed in 1940
National Register of Historic Places in Middlesex County, Massachusetts